Echinodorus reptilis is a species of plant in the Alismataceae from South America.

References

Further reading
Lehtonen, Samuli. "Systematics of the Alismataceae—A morphological evaluation." Aquatic Botany 91.4 (2009): 279–290.
Lehtonen, Samuli. "Indeling van het geslacht Echinodorus."

External links

reptilis
Flora of South America
Aquatic plants